Lygephila viciae is a moth of the family Erebidae. It is found in most of  Europe.

The wingspan is 35–36 mm. There are two generations per year depending on the location. Adults are on wing from May to September.

The larvae feed on Astragalus, Coronilla, Lathyrus, Polygonum and Melilotus species.

References
 Waring, P. en M. Townsend (2006) Nachtvlinders, veldgids met alle in Nederland en België voorkomende soorten, Baarn: Tirion.
 Noctuidae.de

External links

Fauna Europaea
Lepiforum.de

Toxocampina
Moths described in 1822
Moths of Japan
Moths of Europe
Moths of Asia
Taxa named by Jacob Hübner